In organic chemistry, ketonic decarboxylation (also known as decarboxylative ketonization) is a type of organic reaction and a decarboxylation converting two equivalents of a carboxylic acid to a symmetric ketone by the application of heat. Water and carbon dioxide are byproducts:

Bases promote this reaction. The reaction mechanism likely involves nucleophilic attack of the alpha-carbon of one acid group on the other acid group's carbonyl, possibly as a concerted reaction with the decarboxylation. The initial formation of an intermediate carbanion via decarboxylation of one of the acid groups prior to the nucleophilic attack has been proposed, but is unlikely since the byproduct resulting from the carbanion's protonation by the acid has never been reported. This reaction is different from oxidative decarboxylation, which proceeds through a radical mechanism and is characterised by a different product distribution in isotopic labeling experiments with two different carboxylic acids. With two different carboxylic acids, the reaction behaves poorly because of poor selectivity except when one of the acids (for example, a small, volatile one) is used in large excess.

Examples
The dry distillation of calcium acetate to give acetone was reported by Charles Friedel in 1858 and until World War I ketonization was the premier commercial method for its production.

Ketonic decarboxylation of propanoic acid over a manganese(II) oxide catalyst in a tube furnace affords 3-pentanone.  Of commercial interest are related ketonizations using cerium(IV) oxide and manganese dioxide on alumina as the catalysts. 5-Nonanone, which is potentially of interest as a diesel fuel, can be produced from valeric acid.  Stearone is prepared by heating magnesium stearate.

An example of intramolecular ketonization is the conversion of adipic acid to cyclopentanone with barium hydroxide.
 

The synthesis of 4-heptanone illustrates the production of the metal carboxylate in situ. Iron powder and butyric acid are converted to iron butyrate. Pyrolysis of that salt gives the ketone.

References

Organic reactions